Spain has submitted films for the Academy Award for Best International Feature Film since the conception of the award. The award is handed out annually by the United States Academy of Motion Picture Arts and Sciences to a feature-length motion picture produced outside the United States that contains primarily non-English dialogue. The award was created for the 1956 Academy Awards, succeeding the non-competitive Honorary Academy Awards which were presented between 1947 and 1955 to the best foreign language films released in the United States.

, twenty Spanish films have been nominated for the Academy Award for Best Foreign Language Film, four of which have won the award: Begin the Beguine in 1982, Belle Époque in 1993, All About My Mother in 1999 and The Sea Inside in 2004. Among all countries that have submitted films for the award, Spain ranks third in terms of films that have won the award, behind Italy (ten awards) and France (nine awards) and tied with Japan (four awards), and third in terms of nominees, behind France (thirty-four nominations) and Italy (twenty-seven nominations).

Since the 1980s, the Spanish submission has been decided annually by the Academia de las Artes y las Ciencias Cinematográficas de España (known in English as the Spanish Academy of Arts and Cinematographic Sciences or AACCE). Beginning in 2001, the academy has announced a three-film shortlist before announcing the winning Spanish film.

Film director José Luis Garci has represented Spain seven times, achieving four nominations and one win. Pedro Almodóvar has represented Spain seven times, and has achieved three Oscar nominations, including one win. Carlos Saura has represented Spain five times.

All submissions were primarily in Spanish language, with the notable exceptions of That Obscure Object of Desire (French and Spanish), Black Bread (Catalan), Flowers (Basque), Summer 1993 (Catalan) and Alcarràs (Catalan).

Submissions
The Academy of Motion Picture Arts and Sciences has invited the film industries of various countries to submit their best film for the Academy Award for Best Foreign Language Film since 1956. The Foreign Language Film Award Committee oversees the process and reviews all the submitted films. Following this, they vote via secret ballot to determine the five nominees for the award. Before the award was created, the Board of Governors of the academy voted on a film every year that was considered the best foreign language film released in the United States, and there were no submissions. Below is a list of the films that have been submitted by Spain for review by the academy for the award since its first entry in 1959.

Shortlisted films
Each year since 2001, Spain has announced a three-film shortlist (four in 2013) prior to announcing its official Oscar candidate. The following films have been shortlisted by the Academia de las Artes y las Ciencias Cinematográficas de España:

 2001: Sex and Lucia · Sin noticias de Dios
 2002: Talk to Her · Story of a Kiss
 2003: South from Granada · Hotel Danubio
 2004: Bad Education · Tiovivo c. 1950
 2005: Ninette · Princesses
 2006: Alatriste · Salvador
 2007: Las 13 rosas · Sunday Light
 2008: Seven Billiard Tables · Sangre de Mayo
 2009: Map of the Sounds of Tokyo · Fat People
 2010: Cell 211 · Lope
 2011: The Skin I Live In · The Sleeping Voice
 2012: The Artist and the Model · Unit 7
 2013: Cannibal · Family United · Scorpion in Love
 2014: 10,000 km · El Niño
 2015: Felices 140 · Magical Girl
 2016: The Bride · The Olive Tree
 2017: Abracadabra · 1898, Our Last Men in the Philippines
 2018: Everybody Knows · Giant
 2019: While at War · Buñuel in the Labyrinth of the Turtles
 2020: Fire Will Come · The Platform
 2021: Parallel Mothers · Mediterraneo: The Law of the Sea
 2022: Lullaby · The Beasts

See also
List of Academy Award winners and nominees for Best Foreign Language Film
List of Academy Award-winning foreign language films
List of Spanish Academy Award winners and nominees

Notes

References

External links
The Official Academy Awards Database
The Motion Picture Credits Database
IMDb Academy Awards Page

Spain
Academy Award